Accheja is a village in the Hapur district of Uttar Pradesh, India. It is well connected to Delhi, Ghaziabad and Meerut.

Villages in Hapur district